Seimei may refer to:

Seimei Shrine, a Shinto shrine dedicated to Abe no Seimei
5541 Seimei, an asteroid discovered in 1976
Seimei, a solar term in traditional East Asian calendars
"Seimei/Still Alive" (声明/Still Alive), a single by Japanese rock band B'z
Seimei (free skate program), by figure skater Yuzuru Hanyu

People
, a Japanese onmyōji from the Heian period
, Japanese handball player

Fictional Characters
, a character from the manga series Loveless

Japanese masculine given names